The 1970–71 Pittsburgh Penguins season was the franchise's fourth season in the National Hockey League.

Offseason

Regular season

Final standings

Schedule and results

|- style="background:#fcf;"
| 1 || Oct 10 || Buffalo Sabres || 2–1 || Pittsburgh Penguins || Civic Arena (11,189) || 0–1–0 || 0
|- style="background:#fcf;"
| 2 || Oct 15 || Pittsburgh Penguins || 2–4 || Minnesota North Stars || Met Center (12,134) || 0–2–0 || 0
|- style="background:#ffc;"
| 3 || Oct 17 || Philadelphia Flyers || 0–0 || Pittsburgh Penguins || Civic Arena (7,535) || 0–2–1 || 1
|- style="background:#ffc;"
| 4 || Oct 18 || Pittsburgh Penguins || 1–1 || Buffalo Sabres || Buffalo Memorial Auditorium (8,656) || 0–2–2 || 2
|- style="background:#fcf;"
| 5 || Oct 21 || Pittsburgh Penguins || 2–4 || Los Angeles Kings || The Forum (6,903) || 0–3–2 || 2
|- style="background:#cfc;"
| 6 || Oct 23 || Pittsburgh Penguins || 3–1 || California Golden Seals || Oakland Coliseum Arena (4,043) || 1–3–2 || 4
|- style="background:#ffc;"
| 7 || Oct 25 || Pittsburgh Penguins || 1–1 || Vancouver Canucks || Pacific Coliseum (13,329) || 1–3–3 || 5
|- style="background:#cfc;"
| 8 || Oct 28 || Los Angeles Kings || 3–5 || Pittsburgh Penguins || Civic Arena (5,028) || 2–3–3 || 7
|- style="background:#fcf;"
| 9 || Oct 31 || Chicago Black Hawks || 5–2 || Pittsburgh Penguins || Civic Arena (8,412) || 2–4–3 || 7
|-

|- style="background:#fcf;"
| 10 || Nov 1 || Pittsburgh Penguins || 2–3 || Philadelphia Flyers || The Spectrum (14,620) || 2–5–3 || 7
|- style="background:#cfc;"
| 11 || Nov 4 || Vancouver Canucks || 3–8 || Pittsburgh Penguins || Civic Arena (5,029) || 3–5–3 || 9
|- style="background:#ffc;"
| 12 || Nov 7 || Boston Bruins || 2–2 || Pittsburgh Penguins || Civic Arena (12,909) || 3–5–4 || 10
|- style="background:#ffc;"
| 13 || Nov 8 || Pittsburgh Penguins || 3–3 || Detroit Red Wings || Olympia Stadium (12,662) || 3–5–5 || 11
|- style="background:#fcf;"
| 14 || Nov 10 || Los Angeles Kings || 5–1 || Pittsburgh Penguins || Civic Arena (8,089) || 3–6–5 || 11
|- style="background:#ffc;"
| 15 || Nov 11 || Pittsburgh Penguins || 3–3 || New York Rangers || Madison Square Garden (IV) (17,250) || 3–6–6 || 12
|- style="background:#cfc;"
| 16 || Nov 14 || California Golden Seals || 1–6 || Pittsburgh Penguins || Civic Arena (11,075) || 4–6–6 || 14
|- style="background:#fcf;"
| 17 || Nov 19 || St. Louis Blues || 1–0 || Pittsburgh Penguins || Civic Arena (9,027) || 4–7–6 || 14
|- style="background:#cfc;"
| 18 || Nov 21 || Detroit Red Wings || 1–6 || Pittsburgh Penguins || Civic Arena (11,298) || 5–7–6 || 16
|- style="background:#fcf;"
| 19 || Nov 22 || Pittsburgh Penguins || 2–4 || Boston Bruins || Boston Garden (14,994) || 5–8–6 || 16
|- style="background:#ffc;"
| 20 || Nov 24 || Pittsburgh Penguins || 4–4 || Toronto Maple Leafs || Maple Leaf Gardens (16,384) || 5–8–7 || 17
|- style="background:#ffc;"
| 21 || Nov 25 || Buffalo Sabres || 4–4 || Pittsburgh Penguins || Civic Arena (9,705) || 5–8–8 || 18
|- style="background:#fcf;"
| 22 || Nov 28 || Pittsburgh Penguins || 1–5 || Montreal Canadiens || Montreal Forum (16,838) || 5–9–8 || 18
|- style="background:#fcf;"
| 23 || Nov 29 || Pittsburgh Penguins || 2–6 || New York Rangers || Madison Square Garden (IV) (17,250) || 5–10–8 || 18
|-

|- style="background:#ffc;"
| 24 || Dec 2 || Montreal Canadiens || 3–3 || Pittsburgh Penguins || Civic Arena (8,601) || 5–10–9 || 19
|- style="background:#cfc;"
| 25 || Dec 5 || Vancouver Canucks || 1–3 || Pittsburgh Penguins || Civic Arena (8,111) || 6–10–9 || 21
|- style="background:#fcf;"
| 26 || Dec 6 || Pittsburgh Penguins || 3–6 || Boston Bruins || Boston Garden (14,994) || 6–11–9 || 21
|- style="background:#cfc;"
| 27 || Dec 8 || Toronto Maple Leafs || 0–4 || Pittsburgh Penguins || Civic Arena (7,034) || 7–11–9 || 23
|- style="background:#ffc;"
| 28 || Dec 9 || Pittsburgh Penguins || 2–2 || Minnesota North Stars || Met Center (12,222) || 7–11–10 || 24
|- style="background:#fcf;"
| 29 || Dec 11 || Pittsburgh Penguins || 2–3 || St. Louis Blues || St. Louis Arena (17,764) || 7–12–10 || 24
|- style="background:#fcf;"
| 30 || Dec 12 || Minnesota North Stars || 1–0 || Pittsburgh Penguins || Civic Arena (9,031) || 7–13–10 || 24
|- style="background:#fcf;"
| 31 || Dec 16 || Toronto Maple Leafs || 4–2 || Pittsburgh Penguins || Civic Arena (7,222) || 7–14–10 || 24
|- style="background:#cfc;"
| 32 || Dec 19 || Detroit Red Wings || 1–9 || Pittsburgh Penguins || Civic Arena (8,011) || 8–14–10 || 26
|- style="background:#fcf;"
| 33 || Dec 20 || Pittsburgh Penguins || 1–2 || Chicago Black Hawks || Chicago Stadium (-) || 8–15–10 || 26
|- style="background:#fcf;"
| 34 || Dec 23 || Pittsburgh Penguins || 1–6 || New York Rangers || Madison Square Garden (IV) (17,250) || 8–16–10 || 26
|- style="background:#fcf;"
| 35 || Dec 25 || Pittsburgh Penguins || 4–8 || Boston Bruins || Boston Garden (14,994) || 8–17–10 || 26
|- style="background:#cfc;"
| 36 || Dec 26 || Boston Bruins || 2–4 || Pittsburgh Penguins || Civic Arena (13,050) || 9–17–10 || 28
|- style="background:#ffc;"
| 37 || Dec 30 || Pittsburgh Penguins || 3–3 || Montreal Canadiens || Montreal Forum (16,753) || 9–17–11 || 29
|- style="background:#cfc;"
| 38 || Dec 31 || Minnesota North Stars || 1–4 || Pittsburgh Penguins || Civic Arena (10,337) || 10–17–11 || 31
|-

|- style="background:#fcf;"
| 39 || Jan 2 || New York Rangers || 3–1 || Pittsburgh Penguins || Civic Arena (12,444) || 10–18–11 || 31
|- style="background:#fcf;"
| 40 || Jan 6 || Pittsburgh Penguins || 3–4 || Philadelphia Flyers || The Spectrum (12,127) || 10–19–11 || 31
|- style="background:#fcf;"
| 41 || Jan 9 || Pittsburgh Penguins || 2–5 || Toronto Maple Leafs || Maple Leaf Gardens (16,485) || 10–20–11 || 31
|- style="background:#cfc;"
| 42 || Jan 13 || Los Angeles Kings || 2–4 || Pittsburgh Penguins || Civic Arena (7,575) || 11–20–11 || 33
|- style="background:#ffc;"
| 43 || Jan 14 || Pittsburgh Penguins || 2–2 || Detroit Red Wings || Olympia Stadium (11,360) || 11–20–12 || 34
|- style="background:#cfc;"
| 44 || Jan 16 || Pittsburgh Penguins || 4–3 || Vancouver Canucks || Pacific Coliseum (14,098) || 12–20–12 || 36
|- style="background:#cfc;"
| 45 || Jan 20 || Pittsburgh Penguins || 4–2 || California Golden Seals || Oakland Coliseum Arena (3,293) || 13–20–12 || 38
|- style="background:#fcf;"
| 46 || Jan 21 || Pittsburgh Penguins || 2–4 || Los Angeles Kings || The Forum (7,587) || 13–21–12 || 38
|- style="background:#cfc;"
| 47 || Jan 23 || Vancouver Canucks || 1–4 || Pittsburgh Penguins || Civic Arena (12,304) || 14–21–12 || 40
|- style="background:#cfc;"
| 48 || Jan 27 || Toronto Maple Leafs || 1–3 || Pittsburgh Penguins || Civic Arena (9,039) || 15–21–12 || 42
|- style="background:#fcf;"
| 49 || Jan 28 || Pittsburgh Penguins || 1–4 || Chicago Black Hawks || Chicago Stadium (-) || 15–22–12 || 42
|- style="background:#cfc;"
| 50 || Jan 30 || Chicago Black Hawks || 1–3 || Pittsburgh Penguins || Civic Arena (12,528) || 16–22–12 || 44
|-

|- style="background:#cfc;"
| 51 || Feb 3 || California Golden Seals || 1–6 || Pittsburgh Penguins || Civic Arena (10,208) || 17–22–12 || 46
|- style="background:#ffc;"
| 52 || Feb 5 || Pittsburgh Penguins || 2–2 || St. Louis Blues || St. Louis Arena (18,206) || 17–22–13 || 47
|- style="background:#fcf;"
| 53 || Feb 7 || Pittsburgh Penguins || 0–1 || Chicago Black Hawks || Chicago Stadium (-) || 17–23–13 || 47
|- style="background:#fcf;"
| 54 || Feb 9 || Pittsburgh Penguins || 1–4 || Montreal Canadiens || Montreal Forum (16,211) || 17–24–13 || 47
|- style="background:#cfc;"
| 55 || Feb 10 || Philadelphia Flyers || 3–5 || Pittsburgh Penguins || Civic Arena (10,311) || 18–24–13 || 49
|- style="background:#cfc;"
| 56 || Feb 13 || Chicago Black Hawks || 4–5 || Pittsburgh Penguins || Civic Arena (10,755) || 19–24–13 || 51
|- style="background:#fcf;"
| 57 || Feb 14 || Pittsburgh Penguins || 4–5 || Minnesota North Stars || Met Center (15,042) || 19–25–13 || 51
|- style="background:#fcf;"
| 58 || Feb 17 || Pittsburgh Penguins || 3–4 || Toronto Maple Leafs || Maple Leaf Gardens (16,413) || 19–26–13 || 51
|- style="background:#ffc;"
| 59 || Feb 18 || Pittsburgh Penguins || 6–6 || Buffalo Sabres || Buffalo Memorial Auditorium (9,969) || 19–26–14 || 52
|- style="background:#fcf;"
| 60 || Feb 20 || New York Rangers || 2–0 || Pittsburgh Penguins || Civic Arena (13,200) || 19–27–14 || 52
|- style="background:#ffc;"
| 61 || Feb 24 || St. Louis Blues || 5–5 || Pittsburgh Penguins || Civic Arena (10,005) || 19–27–15 || 53
|- style="background:#fcf;"
| 62 || Feb 27 || New York Rangers || 4–0 || Pittsburgh Penguins || Civic Arena (12,419) || 19–28–15 || 53
|- style="background:#fcf;"
| 63 || Feb 28 || Pittsburgh Penguins || 2–4 || Detroit Red Wings || Olympia Stadium (12,683) || 19–29–15 || 53
|-

|- style="background:#cfc;"
| 64 || Mar 3 || Montreal Canadiens || 0–4 || Pittsburgh Penguins || Civic Arena (8,011) || 20–29–15 || 55
|- style="background:#fcf;"
| 65 || Mar 6 || Boston Bruins || 6–3 || Pittsburgh Penguins || Civic Arena (13,020) || 20–30–15 || 55
|- style="background:#ffc;"
| 66 || Mar 7 || California Golden Seals || 3–3 || Pittsburgh Penguins || Civic Arena (11,283) || 20–30–16 || 56
|- style="background:#ffc;"
| 67 || Mar 10 || Philadelphia Flyers || 2–2 || Pittsburgh Penguins || Civic Arena (8,590) || 20–30–17 || 57
|- style="background:#ffc;"
| 68 || Mar 13 || Minnesota North Stars || 0–0 || Pittsburgh Penguins || Civic Arena (10,284) || 20–30–18 || 58
|- style="background:#fcf;"
| 69 || Mar 14 || Montreal Canadiens || 5–1 || Pittsburgh Penguins || Civic Arena (8,741) || 20–31–18 || 58
|- style="background:#fcf;"
| 70 || Mar 17 || Pittsburgh Penguins || 2–5 || California Golden Seals || Oakland Coliseum Arena (2,647) || 20–32–18 || 58
|- style="background:#fcf;"
| 71 || Mar 19 || Pittsburgh Penguins || 4–6 || Vancouver Canucks || Pacific Coliseum (15,570) || 20–33–18 || 58
|- style="background:#fcf;"
| 72 || Mar 20 || Pittsburgh Penguins || 4–8 || Los Angeles Kings || The Forum (7,771) || 20–34–18 || 58
|- style="background:#cfc;"
| 73 || Mar 24 || Detroit Red Wings || 2–8 || Pittsburgh Penguins || Civic Arena (9,025) || 21–34–18 || 60
|- style="background:#fcf;"
| 74 || Mar 28 || Pittsburgh Penguins || 1–3 || Philadelphia Flyers || The Spectrum (14,620) || 21–35–18 || 60
|- style="background:#fcf;"
| 75 || Mar 31 || Buffalo Sabres || 6–4 || Pittsburgh Penguins || Civic Arena (7,051) || 21–36–18 || 60
|-

|- style="background:#ffc;"
| 76 || Apr 1 || Pittsburgh Penguins || 3–3 || Buffalo Sabres || Buffalo Memorial Auditorium (10,429) || 21–36–19 || 61
|- style="background:#fcf;"
| 77 || Apr 3 || Pittsburgh Penguins || 3–4 || St. Louis Blues || St. Louis Arena (18,529) || 21–37–19 || 61
|- style="background:#ffc;"
| 78 || Apr 4 || St. Louis Blues || 1–1 || Pittsburgh Penguins || Civic Arena (10,117) || 21–37–20 || 62
|-

|- style="text-align:center;"
| Legend:       = Win       = Loss       = Tie

Playoffs
The Penguins failed to make the playoffs, despite making it last year.

Player statistics
Skaters

Goaltenders

†Denotes player spent time with another team before joining the Penguins.  Stats reflect time with the Penguins only.
‡Denotes player was traded mid-season.  Stats reflect time with the Penguins only.

Awards and records
 Ken Schinkel became the first player to record 100 assists with the Penguins. He did so in a 2–5 loss to California on March 17.
 Wally Boyer became the first player in franchise history to have a final plus-minus of at least +10.

Transactions
The Penguins were involved in the following transactions during the 1970–71 season:

Trades

Other

Draft picks

Pittsburgh Penguins' picks at the 1970 NHL Entry Draft.

References
 
 Player stats on Hockey Database
 Game log on NHL Database

Pittsburgh Penguins seasons
Pittsburgh
Pittsburgh
Pitts
Pitts